The Finkol River is a river on the Micronesian island of Kosrae. It flows south from the slopes of Mount Finkol, reaching the Pacific Ocean close to Utwa Ma.

References
Bendure, G. & Friary, N. (1988) Micronesia:A travel survival kit. South Yarra, VIC: Lonely Planet.

Kosrae
Rivers of the Federated States of Micronesia